John O'Driscoll may refer to:

John O'Driscoll (rugby union) (born 1953), former Ireland international rugby union player
John O'Driscoll (Gaelic footballer) (born 1967), retired Irish sportsperson
John Francis O'Driscoll, known as Jackie O'Driscoll, Irish footballer

See also
John Driscoll (disambiguation)